Top Secret Affair is a 1957 American romantic comedy film made by Carrollton Inc. and distributed by Warner Bros. that stars Susan Hayward and Kirk Douglas. It was directed by H. C. Potter and produced by Martin Rackin and Milton Sperling from a screenplay by Roland Kibbee and Allan Scott. (Carrollton Inc. was Hayward's own production company, named for her adopted hometown in Georgia.)

The story is very loosely adapted from the 1951 novel Melville Goodwin, U.S.A. by John P. Marquand, which had previously been adapted in 1952 for television's "Pulitzer Prize Playhouse." Hollywood avoided filming the novel for years because of its touchy subject matter: a married general's affair with a wealthy journalist. The screenwriters finally wound up rewriting the plot. The names of the two characters—Melville Goodwin and Dottie Peale—were retained, but both were made single. The film's credits state that it is "based on characters" in Marquand's book, rather than on the book itself.

The music score was by Roy Webb, the cinematography by Stanley Cortez and costume design by Charles LeMaire.

The film co-stars Paul Stewart and Jim Backus. The original leads were to be Humphrey Bogart and wife Lauren Bacall, and they were filmed doing a wardrobe test in 1956. But Bogart's illness forced his withdrawal from the project, and Bacall opted to remain at home to care for him until his death in 1957.

Plot
Melville A. "Ironpants" Goodwin (Kirk Douglas) is a much-decorated U.S. Army major general who has just been appointed chairman of the Joint Atomic International Commission by the President of the United States. This is upsetting to wealthy Dorothy "Dottie" Peale (Susan Hayward), a media mogul who wanted a close friend of her father's to get the position.

Dottie is accustomed to getting her way and decides to do something about it. She gets the Army to send General Goodwin to her estate on Long Island for a lengthy interview and photo session for one of her popular Peale Enterprises publications. Her plot is to ruin Goodwin's reputation as a squeaky-clean, red-blooded American hero. Dottie hides a tape recorder in her home, and assigns a photographer to catch Goodwin in compromising situations. Having heard rumors that he is secretly a ladies' man, she also hopes to get the general to disclose something scandalous.

Every attempt to catch Goodwin off guard or make him appear a fool fails. Drastic measures are called for, what Dottie terms "night maneuvers." She takes the general to a nightclub, tries to get him drunk, coaxing him to sing and dance in a vain attempt to humiliate him. Nothing works. A little tipsy herself, Dottie falls off a diving board of her swimming pool at home. Goodwin rescues her, leading to a night of romance.

Dottie's attitude is changed. She plans to marry Goodwin and maybe even help him become president of the United States, which would make her first lady. To her surprise, the general has no plans to continue this romance. He tells her about a love affair with a woman named Yvette to whom he revealed top-secret information during the Korean War. When he found out Yvette was an enemy spy, he had to have her shot.

A rejected Dottie goes back to her original plan to ruin him. Her magazine's story, "Blabbermouth Goodwin", results in a Senate inquiry into his behavior. Unfortunately for the general, his activity in the Yvette spy case is still top secret, and he is forbidden to discuss it.

Questioned by hostile Senator Burdick (Roland Winters) about another girl in the story, Goodwin reveals that she was not a grown woman but a 7-year-old orphan. He has explanations for everything else and demonstrates that his conduct has been exemplary at all times. Dottie feels ashamed of her role in this and confirms on the stand his assertion that the article was filled with exaggerations and lies. Yet she cannot say the same about the matter of Yvette.

Goodwin is unable to get permission to speak about Yvette through the usual channels. In desperation, he sends Colonel Homer Gooch (Jim Backus) to see the President. Finally, the spy case is declassified. The general testifies that the Army knew that Yvette was a spy. When he was informed, he decided to break off the affair, but was ordered to feed her false information in advance of an important counterattack.

Goodwin is publicly cleared of wrongdoing and recognized as a bigger hero than ever. In front of a gaggle of Washington reporters, he drags a protesting but obviously willing Dottie into a waiting car, signaling that their romance is on again.

Cast
 Susan Hayward as Dorothy "Dottie" Peale
 Kirk Douglas as Maj. Gen. Melville A. Goodwin
 Paul Stewart as Phil Bentley, Dottie's assistant and conscience
 Jim Backus as Col. Homer W. Gooch, Goodwin's Public Information Officer
 John Cromwell as General Daniel A. Grimshaw, Goodwin's commanding officer
 Roland Winters as Sen. Burdick
 Arthur Gould-Porter as Holmes, Dottie's butler
 Michael Fox as Reporter Laszlo "Lotzie" Kovach
 Frank Gerstle as Sgt. Kruger
 Charles Lane as Bill Hadley

Reception
Susan Hayward later said the film was "very good – but nobody went to see it."

References

External links
 
 
 
 

1957 films
1957 romantic comedy films
American romantic comedy films
American black-and-white films
1950s English-language films
Films scored by Roy Webb
Films based on American novels
Films directed by H. C. Potter
1950s American films